This is the discography of American pop singer Connie Francis. Throughout her career, she has sold 100 million records worldwide. In 1959, she was recognized as the then best-selling female recording artist in Germany and was once hailed as the worlds best-selling female vocalist in history at that time. She was the first woman to reach #1 on Billboard Hot 100. Billboard ranked her as the 8th Top Artist of the Decade (60s).

The MGM Records Era 1955–1970

US singles

US albums

US extended plays

UK singles

Post MGM Records Era (1970 – present)

US singles

US albums

Germany singles

Germany albums

International singles

International albums

References

External links
 Appel, Gerrit Jan (Hrsg.): Among Our Souvenirs: Memories of Connie Francis, LULU Enterprises, Morrisville (North Carolina), 2008, 
 Feddersen, Jan: Connie Francis, companion book to 5 CD retrospective "Lass mir die bunten Träume", Bear Family Records BCD 15 786 EI, Hambergen 1994
 Francis, Connie: For Every Young Heart (Autobiography), Prentice Hall, 1963
 Francis, Connie: Who's Sorry Now? (Autobiography), St. Martin's Press, 1984, 
 Francis, Connie und andere: Souvenirs, companion book to 4 CD retrospective "Souvenirs", Polydor (New York) 1995, Kat.-Nr. 314 533 382-2
 Greig, Charlotte: Will You Still Love Me Tomorrow? Mädchenbands von den 50er Jahren bis heute, Deutsche Übersetzung Markus Schröder, Rowohlt, Reinbek bei Hamburg 1991, 
 Matheja, Bernd: Tausend Nadelstiche. Briten und Amerikaner singen deutsch, Bear Family Records, Hambergen, 2007, 
 Roberts, Ron: Connie Francis Discography 1955–1973, 1973, revised editions 1979 und 1983
 Roberts, Ron: Connie Francis 1960–1962, companion book to 5 CD retrospective "Kissin', Twistin, Goin' Where The Boys Are", Bear Family Records BCD 16 616 EI, Hambergen 1993
 Ruhlmann, William: Connie Francis 1955–1959, companion book to 5 CD retrospective "White Sox, Pink Lipstick… and Stupid Cupid", Bear Family Records BCD 16 616 EI, Hambergen 1993
 Weize, Richard: Connie Francis, companion book to 8 LP retrospective "Connie Francis in Deutschland", Bear Family Records BFX 15 305, Hambergen/Vollersode 1988
 Connie Francis Official Fan Club
 Discography of all Polydor-distributed MGM Records Singles in Germany, 1960–1970
 History and US album discography of MGM Records
 Online Catalogue of international singles
 Connie Francis discography (Fan Project)

Francis, Connie